2 South African Infantry Battalion is a motorised infantry unit of the South African Army.

History

Origin: Walvis Bay and South West Africa

2 SAI was established on 1 January 1962, at Walvis Bay an enclave of South Africa surrounded by South-West Africa (Namibia). The first officer to command the battalion was Major G.N. Mcloughlin and the first RSM was WO1 J.A.J. Steenkamp. Initially the base consisted of tents, but was later replaced by prefabricated buildings. Basic training took place in the desert and running up Dune 7 became part of that regime.

Units Colours
The unit was awarded its colours by the local municipality in 1969, and adopted the town's motto and flamingo emblem as a consequence.

Freedom of Walvis Bay
On 30 August 1974, the freedom of Walvis Bay was granted to 2 SAI.

Mechanised Battlegroup

While at Walvis Bay, 2 SAI was organised as a battlegroup when on 1 October 1973, an armoured car subunit, D Squadron, from 1 Special Service Battalion's became a part of 2 SSB and subsequently 2 SAI.  An artillery battery, 43 Field Battery, was also added.

This accounts for the unit insignia including at the top the number "2" in infantry colours, with the St Barbara's lightning flash representing the artillery in the middle and armour's old heraldic colours at the bottom. 

These elements and the Transport Park and quartermaster were based at Rooikop, a distance inland because of the rust at the coast.

Training the fledgling SWATF
Since 1981, national servicemen of the SWA Territorial Force were also trained by the battalion.

Operations
2 SAI first saw deployment to the South-West Africa/Angola border in 1968.

2 SAI took part in Operation Savannah during 1975, when South African troops covertly involved themselves in the Angolan Civil War.

Disbandment
The unit disbanded at the end of 1989 when Namibia gained independence.

Reactivation in South Africa

Pomfret, South Africa
On 1 July 1993, the unit was reformed at Pomfret from old members of 32 Battalion, it then resorted under Northern Cape Command.

Zeerust, South Africa
By 1998, the unit was transferred to North West Command and then based in Zeerust.

2 SAI today: SANDF Motorised Infantry
On its reactivation back in South Africa, 2 SAI was transformed into a motorised infantry unit using mostly Samil trucks, Mamba APC's or other un-protected motor vehicles. Samil 20, 50 and 100 trucks transport soldiers, towing guns, and carrying equipment and supplies. Samil trucks are all-wheel drive, in order to have vehicles that function reliably in extremes of weather and terrain. Motorised Infantry have an advantage in mobility allowing them to move to critical sectors of the battlefield faster, allowing better response to enemy movements, as well as the ability to outmanoeuvre the enemy.

Leadership

Leadership

Insignia

Previous Dress Insignia

As a national servicemen at 2 SAI in 1975, I can categorically state that the beret badges for 1975 were small brass Springboks, without a bar underneath. The instructors still wore the large brass Springbok on their berets.

Current Dress Insignia

References 

Infantry battalions of South Africa
Infantry regiments of South Africa
Military units and formations of South Africa in the Border War
Military units and formations established in 1962